Dakeng (traditional Chinese: 大坑, Hanyu Pinyin: dàkēng) is the area that contains most of the mountain region of Beitun District, Taichung, Taiwan.

Hiking and Biking Trails
Dakeng also boasts a variety of mountain biking and hiking trails. These trails are managed by the Taichung City Government. A total of 10 hiking trails exist. Each trail varies in difficulty in ascent and descent; with trails 6-10 being more flat and suitable for beginners while trails 1-5 are more vertical and pose more of a challenge.  Trails 1-5 are composed of log steps throughout much of the trail with ropes on both sides to help support hikers.

Guanyin Mountain
Dakeng is also home to the Guanyin Temple on Guanyin Mountain located near Central Taiwan University of Science and Technology (CTUST) on Bu Zi Road. The mountain is a popular hiking trail that takes about twenty minutes to hike to the top. The top of Guanyin Mountain offers a good view of the Beitun District.

See also
 Taiwanese hot springs
 List of tourist attractions in Taiwan

References

External links

 Taiwan tourism site on Dakeng

Landforms of Taichung
Tourist attractions in Taichung
Hot springs of Taiwan